Majdy and Majdi or Mejdi or Egyptian variants Magdi or Magdy (in Arabic مجدي) are given names and a surnames. 

Notable people with the name include:

Given name

Majdi
Majdi Allawi (born 1970), lebanese Maronite priest
Majdi Halabi (1985-2005), Israeli Druze soldier who disappeared on duty near Haifa
Majdi Khaldi (born 1961), Palestinian diplomat and ambassador
Majdi Siddiq (born 1985), Qatari footballer of Sudanese descent
Majdi Toumi (born 1975), Tunisian volleyball player

Magdi
Magdi Abdelghani (born 1959), former Egyptian footballer, who played as an attacking midfielder
Magdi Allam (born 1952), Egyptian-born Italian journalist and political leader, noted for his criticism of Islamic Extremism
Magdi Wahba (1925–1991), Egyptian university professor, Johnsonian scholar, and lexicographer
Magdi Yacoub, FRS (born 1935), Professor of Cardiothoracic Surgery at Imperial College London

Magdy
Magdy Atwa, Egyptian football midfielder
Magdy Conyd (born 1939), Canadian fencer
Magdy Galal Sharawi (born 1946), retired senior Egyptian Air Force officer
Magdy Hatata (born 1941), retired Egyptian military officer 
Magdy Ishak (born 1947 in Suez, Egypt), orthopedic surgeon, President of the Egyptian Medical Society UK
Magdy Tolba (born 1964), former Egyptian international midfielder

Mejdi
Mejdi Kaabi (born 1982), Tunisian chess player
Mejdi Traoui (born 1983), Tunisian football player

Surname

Majdi
Aya Majdi (born 1994), Egyptian born Qatari table tennis player
Muhammad Zainul Majdi (born 1972), Indonesian politician and governor

Magdy
 Ahmed Magdy (footballer, born 1986), Egyptian football defender
 Ahmed Magdy (footballer, born 1989), Egyptian football right wing back
 Ahmed Magdy (actor) (born 1986), Egyptian-Algerian actor and director

See also
Majdy, a village in the administrative district of Gmina Stawiguda, within Olsztyn County, Warmian-Masurian Voivodeship, in northern Poland
Mejdi Tours